The 2010 FIA WTCC Race of Morocco was the second round of the 2010 World Touring Car Championship season and the second running of the FIA WTCC Race of Morocco. It was held at the Marrakech Street Circuit in Marrakech, Morocco on 2 May 2010. The two races were won by Gabriele Tarquini for SR-Sport and Andy Priaulx for BMW Team RBM, but both races were heavily affected by safety car periods.

Background
After the first round in Brazil, Chevrolet driver Yvan Muller was tied at the top of the drivers' standings with SR-Sport's Tarquini. Scuderia Proteam Motorsport's Sergio Hernández was leading the Yokohama Independents' Trophy.

Swiss team Maurer Motorsport joined the grid for Morocco, running a pair of Chevrolet Lacettis for local drivers Ismaïl Sbaï and Youssaf El Marnissi.

Report

Testing and free practice
Zengõ-Dension Team driver Norbert Michelisz was fastest in Friday's test session, with SR-Sport driver Tom Coronel second Chevrolet's Robert Huff third. The session was red flagged when Sbaï put his Lacetti into the wall, while Maurer Motorsport teammate El Marnissi stopped with technical problems. Chevrolet factory driver Alain Menu also crashed during the session on the dusty track, hitting a wall and causing considerable damage to his car.

Tarquini topped the first practice session on Saturday morning, ahead of BMW driver Priaulx and SR-Sport teammate Tiago Monteiro. Franz Engstler was the fastest independent driver. Wiechers-Sport's local driver Mehdi Bennani crashed at turn four on his first flying lap.

Tarquini stayed on top in free practice two with Friday pace setter Michelisz second and Chevrolet driver Muller third. Having crashed in the morning session, Bennani was the fastest independent by setting the twelfth fastest time.

Qualifying
Yvan Muller was the early pacesetter in Q1, before Chevrolet teammate Menu crashed into the wall on the exit of Turn 14, bringing out the red flags. When the session was restarted, SR-Sport driver Tarquini moved to the top of the timesheets, before being demoted by Zengő–Dension Team's Michelisz. However, the Hungarian crashed at Turn 3 after setting his fastest lap, bringing out the red flag again, this time ending the session early. BMW Team RBM drivers Augusto Farfus and Priaulx dropped out of the top ten just before the session was stopped.

Q2 was halted after five minutes due to oil on the track at Turn 2 left by Engstler after the independent BMW driver had hit the wall. After the green flag, Tarquini set a quick time to move into P1. The session was stopped once again when Michel Nykjær crashed at Turn 10. The session did not restart, giving Tarquini pole position ahead of Huff, Jordi Gené, Monteiro, Muller, Nykjær and Coronel. Fredy Barth started eighth, ahead of Engstler and Michelisz. El Marnissi did not participate in qualifying or the races for personal reasons.

Warm-Up
SR-Sport filled the top three places in Sunday morning warm–up with Coronel setting the fastest time. The highest placed BMW of Farfus was fourth and the quickest Chevrolet of Huff was seventh.

Race One
It took three attempts at the rolling start for the first race, where all drivers must be lined-up in a two-by-two order before the race director allows the race to start. Once they finally got underway, pole sitter Tarquini led the field through the first chicane. Fellow SEAT driver Nykjær ran wide as he was battling for third position with the SEAT of Gené, resulting in both drivers dropping down the field. The main beneficiary of this was Fredy Barth who moved up from eighth to third in the opening lap. The Swiss driver made a move on second-placed Huff on the second lap, nudging the Chevrolet driver into a slide, which he did well to control and keep his position. Monteiro took advantage to take third from Barth. Further back, Priaulx passed Menu for eighth position and pole position for the second race.

The safety car was deployed halfway through the race after Andrei Romanov crashed his Liqui Moly Team Engstler BMW 320si at Turn 15, and Moroccan local Ismaïl Sbaï appeared to spin his car on his own oil. The marshals struggled to remove the stricken car of Romanov from the circuit and so the safety car remained out for the next ten minutes, until the end of the race, allowing Tarquini to lead Huff and Monteiro to victory. Barth, Tom Coronel, Yvan Muller, Norbert Michelisz, Priaulx, Menu and Augusto Farfus rounded out the top 10.

Race Two
Pole sitter Priaulx made a good start to Race 2, but drama unfolded behind as fellow front-row starter Michelisz stalled his car. As other cars moved to avoid him, Huff and Barth made contact once again, this time causing Huff to spin into the pit wall. Tarquini also got caught up with the spinning Huff, but got away with minor bodywork damage. Darryl O'Young swerved to avoid Huff's stricken Chevrolet and hit Bamboo Engineering teammate Harry Vaulkhard and then Scuderia Proteam Motorsport driver Hernández. Vaulkhard and Hernández joined Huff in retiring, while O'Young was able to retreat to the pits and rejoin the race after repairing the damage. The safety car was called into action and stayed out until lap seven of 13.

After the restart, Menu attempted to pass Farfus around the outside of Turn 4, but the pair tangled and both veered into the wall on the outside. Farfus limped back to retire in the pits, but the safety car was deployed again to remove the stranded Chevrolet of Menu and clear up the debris from the accident.

The safety car returned to the pits with just one lap of racing to go, with Priaulx fighting hard to keep Muller behind him, resulting in Priaulx brushing the wall at Turn 4. He held on though to win from Muller, Coronel, Monteiro, Barth and Tarquini. Local hero Bennani dropped from seventh to ninth on the final lap, finishing behind Nykjær and Gené. Michelisz recovered from his stall at the start to finish tenth.

Results

Qualifying

Race 1

Bold denotes Fastest lap.

Race 2

Bold denotes Fastest lap.

Standings after the event

Drivers' Championship standings

Yokohama Independents' Trophy standings

Manufacturers' Championship standings

 Note: Only the top five positions are included for both sets of drivers' standings.

References

Results Booklet PDF at MST Systems

Morocco
FIA WTCC Race of Morocco
FIA WTCC Race of Morocco